Hans Peter Duerr (born 6 June 1943) is a German anthropologist and author of ten books on anthropology. Duerr studied at both the University of Vienna and the University of Heidelberg, eventually gaining his doctorate in 1971 with a dissertation on consciousness theory in philosophy. From 1975 through to 1980 he worked as a lecturer and visiting professor of ethnology and cultural history at the University of Zurich, University of Kassel and University of Bern, before settling down permanently at Kassel. From 1992 to 1999 he taught as a professor of anthropology and cultural history at the University of Bremen, before moving back to Heidelberg. 

He has published multiple books in German, one of which has been translated as Dreamtime: Concerning the Boundary between Wilderness and Civilization. From 1988 through to 2002 he published a five volume magnum opus entitled Der Mythos vom Zivilisationsprozeß.

Bibliography
Ni Dieu - ni mètre. Anarchische Bemerkungen zur Bewußtseins- und Erkenntnistheorie. 1974
Traumzeit. Über die Grenzen zwischen Wildnis und Zivilisation. 1978
Satyricon. 1982
Sedna oder Die Liebe zum Leben. 1984
Der Mythos vom Zivilisationsprozeß
Band 1: Nacktheit und Scham. 1988
Band 2: Intimität. 1990
Band 3: Obszönität und Gewalt. 1993
Band 4: Der erotische Leib. 1997
Band 5: Die Tatsachen des Lebens 2002
Frühstück im Grünen. Essays und Interviews. 1995
Gänge und Untergänge. 1999
Rungholt. Die Suche nach einer versunkenen Stadt. 2005
Tränen der Göttinnen. 2008
Die Fahrt der Argonauten. 2011

External links
 
 Interview with Hans Peter Duerr from 2009 (in German)
 Themenseite Hans Peter Duerr in the Spiegel-Online (in German)
 Interview aus dem Jahr 1996 (in German)
 Können Hexen fliegen? (in German)
 Kretas Hochkultur im Watt (in German)

German anthropologists
Living people
1943 births
Neoshamanism